The Duckling Gets a Cookie!? is a 2012 picture book by Mo Willems. It is about a duckling that asks for, and receives, a cookie, a pigeon that complains about it, but is then flummoxed when the duckling passes the cookie to him.

In 2014, Weston Woods adapted the book to a 7-minute animated short film, directed by Pete List and starring Willems as the Pigeon and Trixie Willems as the Duckling.

Reception
Booklist, reviewing The Duckling Gets A Cookie!?, wrote "Willems has an extraordinary ability to convey immediate, deep characterization with a few deft strokes. He knows, too, how to spread the action across a picture book, carefully managing the panels and page turns to ramp up the drama. Fans will delight at another outing, and the protagonist's indelible "pigeonality" will welcome newcomers to the club." and the School Library Journal wrote "While just plain fun to read aloud, this book is an excellent conversation starter on the topics of politeness and making reasonable requests. This meta-tale that references the gamut of the Pigeon oeuvre will please fans and newcomers alike." 

The Horn Book Magazine's review noted "Simple speech-balloon text, animated illustrations, and a clean design continue to be a successful formula for Willems’s brand of storytelling." 

The Duckling Gets a Cookie!? has also been reviewed by Publishers Weekly, Kirkus Reviews, Common Sense Media, The New York Times, and AudioFile.

Awards
2013 CCBC Choice,
2013 Irma Black Award - honor

See also
Don't Let the Pigeon Drive the Bus!
The Pigeon Finds a Hot Dog!Don't Let the Pigeon Stay Up Late!The Pigeon Wants a Puppy!The Pigeon Needs a Bath!The Pigeon Will Ride the Roller Coaster!''

References

2012 children's books
American picture books
Fictional ducks
Fictional passerine birds
Cookies in popular culture